El Llano, Spanish for "the plain or open space" or Buen Llano, "good plain", one of the 19th century Pima Villages, was located along the south side of the  Gila River, between Sweetwater and Sacaton, in what is now the Gila River Indian Community in Pinal County, Arizona.

References

Gila River
Native American history of Arizona
History of Arizona
Former populated places in Pinal County, Arizona
Gila River Indian Community